"A Spaceman Came Travelling" is a song by Chris de Burgh. It first appeared on his second studio album, Spanish Train and Other Stories, which was released in 1975. It has been released numerous times as a single, becoming a popular Christmas song, and has appeared on many festive compilation albums.

Single release
The song was not an initial success in the UK and failed to chart. After its first release in 1975 it reached the top position of the Irish single charts staying 15 weeks in the Irish charts and climbed to number 22 in the Canadian airplay charts. However, in 1986, following de Burgh's huge success with "The Lady in Red", its reissue reached number 15 in Ireland charting for only 1 week. The song was also issued as a double A-side with the song "The Ballroom of Romance" and charted for the first time in the UK in 1986, reaching number 40 and staying on the chart for five weeks.

Composition
De Burgh, who had just signed his first recording contract with A&M Records, was broke and "staying at a friend's flat" when he read Chariots of the Gods? by Erich von Däniken.  The book made him think "what if the star of Bethlehem was a space craft and what if there is a benevolent being or entity in the universe keeping an eye on the world and our foolish things that we do to each other?" A  fan of Irish poet William Butler Yeats, whose work "The Second Coming" avers that every 2,000 years or so there would be a major cataclysmic event happening, de Burgh saw the birth of Christ as "such an event and then 2,000 years later there would be a similar" one.  He imagined "the nativity scene, the thing hovering over and I could see the shepherds in the fields and this weird, ethereal music was drifting into the air and they were 'what the heck is that'?"  But he "had no ideas about trying to write a hit record." The song failed to chart when it was first released as a single, but de Burgh says it's been "much better to have a regular recurring song than a hit for three weeks."

The space angle is reflected in the use of a string synthesizer on the track.

New versions

Following the success of "The Lady in Red", a reworked version of the song was released as a single for Christmas 1986, backed with a remixed version of "The Ballroom of Romance".

Certifications

Cover versions
 Austrian band Eela Craig covered the song on Hats of Glass in 1976.
 Taiwanese singer Chyi Chin released "" (Until the end of the world) on his 1994 album .
 Hong Kong singer, Samuel Tai, covered the song in English on his album Looking for a word to replace.
 English rock band Smokie released a cover of the song on Light a Candle – The Christmas Album in 1996.
 Icelandic singer Páll Óskar and harpist Monika Abendroth covered the song on their 2003 Christmas album  (Lights at home).
 Polish dance singer Mandaryna released her version of the song on her 2005 album Mandarynkowy sen and as a Christmas radio single.
 Gregorian released a cover of the song on their Christmas Chants album in 2006.
 Celtic Woman released the song as a bonus track on the German release of their 2010 album Songs from the Heart.  It also featured on their 2011 DVD, Believe, performed by Lisa Lambe, as well as the soundtrack released in 2012.
 An abridged version of the song was performed near the end of the Mrs Brown's Boys 2012 Christmas special.
 Akira the Don recorded a version of the song for his 2016 Christmas EP, Litmas.
 Singers Aled Jones and Russell Watson released their version of the song as the lead single from their November 2022 album Christmas with Aled and Russell.

See also
 1975 in music

References

1976 singles
Chris de Burgh songs
Songs written by Chris de Burgh
British Christmas songs
Mandaryna songs
1975 songs
A&M Records singles
Songs about Jesus
Songs about outer space